Juan José "Juanjo" Cañas Gutiérrez (born 17 April 1972) is a Spanish retired professional footballer who played as a midfielder.

He spent the majority of his career with Betis, where he appeared in 359 official matches over 15 seasons.

Club career
Born in Rota, Andalusia, Cañas represented Real Betis in his professional career and played 228 La Liga games during his tenure (scoring ten goals), his debut in the competition coming on 4 September 1994 in a 0–0 away draw against CD Logroñés; previously, he made a total of 53 first-team appearances over three seasons as the Andalusians were in the Segunda División. The highlight of his lengthy career was lifting the Copa del Rey in 2005, as he was always captain when playing.

Also in the 2004–05 campaign, Cañas still contributed 24 matches to help the club to a fourth place in the league, good enough to reach the qualifying rounds of the UEFA Champions League. From 2006 to 2008 he played for lowly CD Alcalá – also in his native region – in the Segunda División B, and retired at the age of 36. 

Afterwards, Cañas worked two seasons with Betis as a member of their technical staff.

Personal life
Cañas' nephew, José, was also a footballer and a midfielder. He too spent most of his professional career with Betis.

Honours
Betis
Copa del Rey: 2004–05

References

External links

1972 births
Living people
People from Rota, Andalusia
Sportspeople from the Province of Cádiz
Spanish footballers
Footballers from Andalusia
Association football midfielders
La Liga players
Segunda División players
Segunda División B players
Betis Deportivo Balompié footballers
Real Betis players
CD Alcalá players